This is a list of cities by average temperature (monthly and yearly). The temperatures listed are averages of the daily highs and lows. Thus, the actual daytime temperature in a given month will be  higher than the temperature listed here, depending on how large the difference between daily highs and lows is.

Africa

Asia

Europe

North America

Oceania

South America

See also 
 List of cities by sunshine duration
 List of cities by average precipitation
 List of weather records

References

Weather-related lists
Lists of cities
List of cities by average temperature